John Rowntree may refer to:
 John Stephenson Rowntree, director of Rowntree's confectionery company and reformer of the Quaker movement 
 John Wilhelm Rowntree, chocolate and confectionery manufacturer and Quaker religious activist and